Jakkasandra is a locality in Bangalore, Karnataka, India. Located in the center of Koramangala and HSR Layout areas, it is one of the largest neighborhoods, alongside the Agara village, Venkatapura, Sreenivagilu, Ejipura, Madiwala, Kattalipalya, Mesthripalya, and Koramangala village. Jakkasandra is also home to many educational institutions such as the Hottekullappa Government School, the Goldwyn Memorial Public School, and the Asia Pacific World High School.

Festivals of Jakkasandra
Jakkasandra Shree AadiShakti draupadamma Karaga Bangalore Karaga utsava, Shree Renuka Yallamma & Shree Venugopala Swamy, and Shree Muneshwara swamy Pallakki Jathre Mahotsava is celebrated every year, on the second Saturday of April.

History of Jakkasandra 
The history of Jakkasandra dates back many thousands of years. References are found in the Bangalore archaeological department,
 and ancient inscriptions can be found in Jakkasandra.  Lord Shree Venugopala Swami Temple contains inscriptions referring to the Ganga Dynasty of Talkad, having presided over the construction of the temple.

Temples 
Shree MahaGanapathi Temple
Shree Venugopala Swami Temple
Shree Muneshwara Swami Temple
Shree Renuka Yellamma  Devi Temple
Shree Savadatti Yellamma Devi Temple
Shree Kateramma Devi Temple
Shree Maramma Devi Temple
Shree Sapalamma Devi Temple
Shree Kaveramma Devi temple
Shree Lakshminarasimha Swami Temple
Shree Shiradi SaiBaba Swami Temple
Shree Om Shakti Temple

Jakkasandra Lake
Jakkasandra Lake is in the center of Koramangala 3rd block and Koramangala 4th block areas.  Near to the Jakkasandra block are the Koramangala BDA Complex and Mesthri Palya areas.

Jakkasandra ward (BBMP Ward No 173) 
 Population (2011)  24,088 comprising 13,045 males and 11,043 females 
 Area in km2 1.5
 Assembly Constituency ||BTM Layout
 MLA Ramalinga Reddy
 MP Tejaswi Surya
 Corporator Saraswathamma

References 

  Epigraphia Carnatica: Inscriptions in the Bangalore District Volume 8 of Centenary publication Volume 9 of Epigraphia Carnatica, Mysore Archaeological Survey Karnataka cultural heritage series: Epigraphy Mysore archaeological series Aut...

Neighbourhoods in Bangalore